Künter Rothberg (born 13 March 1984 in Viljandi) is an Estonian judoka.

Achievements

References

External links
 

1984 births
Living people
Estonian male judoka
Sportspeople from Viljandi
European Games competitors for Estonia
Judoka at the 2015 European Games
20th-century Estonian people
21st-century Estonian people